Polyana Viana Mota (born 14 June 1992) is a Brazilian professional mixed martial artist who currently competes in the Strawweight division of the Ultimate Fighting Championship (UFC).

Background
Raised solely by her mother, Viana grew up in São Geraldo do Araguaia, a small town in the Pará region of Brazil. She started training Brazilian jiu-jitsu in 2013 and also made her professional mixed martial arts debut in late 2013.

Mixed martial arts career

Ultimate Fighting Championship
Viana made her UFC debut at UFC Fight Night: Machida vs. Anders on 3 February 2018 against Maia Stevenson. She won the fight via rear-naked choke in the first round.

In May 2018 it was announced that Viana would be fighting against JJ Aldrich on UFC 227 in August. Viana would lose the fight via unanimous decision as Aldrich out-boxed her most of the fight.

She next took on Hannah Cifers at UFC 235, a fight she went on to lose by split decision.

Viana took on Veronica Macedo at UFC Fight Night: Shevchenko vs. Carmouche 2. The bout had originally been scheduled between  Macedo and Rachael Ostovich, however on July 29 it was announced that Ostovich would be replaced by Viana for an undisclosed reason. As expected, the fight took place on the ground, but surprisingly Macedo submitted Viana via armbar, a submission Viana herself has finished 6 fights with in her career, as of May 2022. The result was Macedo's first UFC win and the first time in Viana's career she had ever been submitted in a fight.

Viana was scheduled to face Emily Whitmire on March 8, 2020, at UFC 248. At the weigh-ins, Whitmire weighed in at 117.5 pounds, 1.5 pounds over the strawweight non-title fight limit of 116. She was fined 20% of her purse and her bout with Viana was expected to proceed as scheduled at a catchweight. Subsequently, Whitmire was hospitalized the day of the event and the fight was cancelled. The pair was rescheduled on August 29, 2020, at UFC Fight Night 175 in a flyweight bout. Viana won the fight via an armbar submission in round one.

Viana faced Mallory Martin on February 13, 2021, at UFC 258.  She won the fight via an armbar in round one. This win earned her the Performance of the Night award.

Viana faced Tabatha Ricci on May 21, 2022 at UFC Fight Night 206. She lost the fight via unanimous decision.

Viana faced Jinh Yu Frey  on November 5, 2022 at UFC Fight Night 214. She won the fight via knockout in the first round. This win earned her the Performance of the Night award.

Viana is scheduled to face Emily Ducote on April 29, 2023, at UFC Fight Night 223.

Personal life
Viana has a son named Deivid

In January 2019, a man attempted to rob Viana using a fake gun as she waited outside her apartment. Viana punched the man and subdued him until the police arrived. Viana did not face charges as the authorities ruled it was self-defense.

Championships and accomplishments
Ultimate Fighting Championship
Performance of the Night (Two times) 
Jungle Fight
Jungle Fight Strawweight Championship (One time)
One successful title defence

Mixed martial arts record

|-
|Win
|align=center|13–5
|Jinh Yu Frey
|KO (punches)
|UFC Fight Night: Rodriguez vs. Lemos
|
|align=center|1
|align=center|0:47
|Las Vegas, Nevada, United States
|
|-
|Loss
|align=center|12–5
|Tabatha Ricci
|Decision (unanimous)
|UFC Fight Night: Holm vs. Vieira
|
|align=center|3
|align=center|5:00
|Las Vegas, Nevada, United States
|
|-
|Win
|align=center|12–4
|Mallory Martin
|Submission (armbar)
|UFC 258
|
|align=center|1
|align=center|3:18
|Las Vegas, Nevada, United States
|
|-
|Win
|align=center|11–4
|Emily Whitmire
|Submission (armbar)
|UFC Fight Night: Smith vs. Rakić
|
|align=center|1
|align=center|1:53
|Las Vegas, Nevada, United States
|
|-
|Loss
|align=center| 10–4
|Veronica Macedo
|Submission (armbar)
|UFC Fight Night: Shevchenko vs. Carmouche 2 
|
|align=center|1
|align=center|1:09
|Montevideo, Uruguay
|
|-
| Loss
| align=center| 10–3
| Hannah Cifers
| Decision (split)
| UFC 235
| 
| align=center| 3
| align=center| 5:00
| Las Vegas, Nevada, United States
| 
|-
| Loss
| align=center| 10–2
| JJ Aldrich
| Decision (unanimous)
| UFC 227
| 
| align=center| 3
| align=center| 5:00
| Los Angeles, California, United States
| 
|-
| Win
| align=center| 10–1
| Maia Stevenson
| Submission (rear-naked choke)
|UFC Fight Night: Machida vs. Anders
| 
| align=center| 1
| align=center| 3:50
| Belém, Brazil
| 
|-
| Win
| align=center| 9–1
| Pamela Rosa 
| Submission (armbar)
| Watch Out Combat Show 47
| 
| align=center| 1
| align=center| 1:56
| Rio de Janeiro, Brazil
| 
|-
| Win
| align=center| 8–1
| Débora Dias Nascimento
| Submission (armbar)
| Jungle Fight 87
| 
| align=center| 1
| align=center| 3:23
| São Paulo, Brazil
|
|-
| Win
| align=center| 7–1
| Amanda Ribas
| KO (punches)
| Jungle Fight 83
| 
| align=center| 1
| align=center| 2:54
| Rio de Janeiro, Brazil
|
|-
| Win
| align=center| 6–1
| Karol Pereira Silva Cerqueira
| Submission (rear-naked choke)
| Jungle Fight 81
| 
| align=center| 1
| align=center| 2:24
| Palmas, Brazil
|
|-
| Win
| align=center| 5–1
| Giselle Campos
| Submission (armbar)
| Maraba Combat-1.0
| 
| align=center| 1
| align=center| 1:31
| Marabá, Brazil
|
|-
| Loss
| align=center| 4–1
| Aline Sattelmayer
| Decision (unanimous)
| Real Fight 12
| 
| align=center| 3
| align=center| 5:00
| São José dos Campos, Brazil
|
|-
| Win
| align=center| 4–0
| Débora Silva
| TKO (punches)
| Talento Uruará Fight
| 
| align=center| 1
| align=center| 1:09
| Uruará, Brazil
|
|-
| Win
| align=center| 3–0
| Thais Santana
| TKO (punches)
| Araguatins Fight Night MMA
| 
| align=center| ?
| align=center| NA
| Araguatins, Brazil
|
|-
| Win
| align=center| 2–0
| Mirelle Oliveira do Nascimento
| Submission (armbar)
| Piaui Fight MMA 2
| 
| align=center| 2
| align=center| 1:20
| Teresina, Brazil
|
|-
| Win
| align=center| 1–0
| Silvana Pinto
| TKO (doctor stoppage)
| Demolidor Extreme Combat 3
| 
| align=center| 1
| align=center| 1:48
| Marabá, Brazil
|
|-

References

1992 births
Living people
Sportspeople from Pará
Brazilian female mixed martial artists
Ultimate Fighting Championship female fighters
Strawweight mixed martial artists
Mixed martial artists utilizing Brazilian jiu-jitsu
Brazilian practitioners of Brazilian jiu-jitsu
Female Brazilian jiu-jitsu practitioners